Marc Lambron (born 4 February 1957 in Lyon) is a French writer and winner of the Prix Femina, 1993, for L'Oeil du silence.

Bibliography
 Les Menteurs
 L'Impromptu de Madrid, (Flammarion, 1989) 
 L'Œil du silence (1993)
 1941
 Étrangers dans la nuit
 Carnet de bal I et II
 La Nuit des masques
 Une saison sur la terre, (Éditions Grasset, 2006)
 Mignonne, allons voir..., (2007)
 Eh bien, dansez maintenant!, (2008)
 La princesse et le pangolin, (2020)

Honours and awards
 Prix des Deux Magots for L'Impromptu de Madrid in 1989
 Prix Femina for L'Œil du silence in 1993
 Prix Colette for La Nuit des masques
 2014 Académie française Seat 38

References

1957 births
Lycée Henri-IV alumni
École Normale Supérieure alumni
Sciences Po alumni
École nationale d'administration alumni
20th-century French novelists
21st-century French novelists
Prix Femina winners
Prix des Deux Magots winners
Members of the Académie Française
French male novelists
Chevaliers of the Légion d'honneur
Commandeurs of the Ordre des Arts et des Lettres
Writers from Lyon
Living people
20th-century French male writers
21st-century French male writers